Merosargus is a genus of flies in the family Stratiomyidae.

Species
 List of Merosargus species

References

Stratiomyidae
Brachycera genera
Taxa named by Hermann Loew
Diptera of North America
Diptera of South America